The Leistchamm (2,101 m) is a mountain of the Appenzell Alps, located east of Amden in the canton of St. Gallen. It lies at the western end of the range overlooking the Walensee, named Churfirsten.

References

External links
Leistchamm on Hikr

Mountains of the Alps
Mountains of the canton of St. Gallen
Appenzell Alps
Mountains of Switzerland